Hallie Morse Daggett (December 19, 1878 – October 19, 1964) was the first woman hired as a fire lookout by the United States Forest Service.

Daggett worked at Eddy's Gulch Lookout Station at the top of Klamath Peak on the Klamath National Forest in northern California beginning in the summer of 1913.  The Eddy Gulch Lookout Station stood on an isolated mountain, at an elevation of 6,444 feet, and a 3 hours hard climb from the base.  Daggett worked alone at this lookout for fifteen summers.

References

External links
 "A Bit of History For You: American Forestry Circa 1914" - 4-Victor
 "Western Siskiyou County: Gold and Dreams" - Google Books
 Fire Lookouts (Forest History Society, U.S. Forest Service History Collection)
 Hallie M. Daggett: Early Woman Lookout, USFS History Line, Fall 1999 (Forest History Society).

1878 births
1964 deaths
United States Forest Service
American feminists
Place of birth missing